Jim Lembke (born July 24, 1961) is a former Republican member of the Missouri Senate, representing the 1st District from 2009 to 2013. Previously he was a member of the Missouri House of Representatives from 2003 through 2008. In 2011, Lembke led a filibuster over the state accepting extended unemployment benefits from the federal government, effectively cutting off those benefits until an agreement cut state benefits to 20 weeks from 26 weeks. The move was criticized by both Democrats and Republicans, as the state was not required to pay anything for the extended benefits.

He was the only Republican representing a significant portion of St. Louis City in the state legislature. He was defeated by Democrat Scott Sifton in 2012.

Personal life

At the end of his 10 years of service in the Missouri General Assembly, Lembke is now working with United for Missouri. UFM focus is on tax policy, economic freedom and federal intrusion issues in the Capitol and beyond.  Sen. Lembke was the business manager/development director at Providence Christian Academy. From 1987 to 1997 he was owner/partner of Savile Row. From 1982 to 1987 he was the owner of Christopher's Shoes. Sen. Lembke is an elder of Holy Trinity – REC and former board chairman of Providence Christian Academy. He is a member of the South County Chamber; Lemay and Tesson Republican Organizations and was on the board of Sunshine Mission from 1990 to 1993.  A 1979 graduate of Mehlville Senior High School, Sen. Lembke attended Meramec Community College and Covenant Theological Seminary. Sen. Lembke lives in St. Louis County, Missouri with his wife, Donna. They have two children: Anna and Mitchell.

References

Official Manual, State of Missouri, 2005-2006. Jefferson City, MO: Secretary of State.

External links
Jim Lembke for State Senate official campaign website
Missouri Senate - Jim Lembke official government website

1961 births
Living people
Politicians from Chicago
People from St. Louis County, Missouri
Republican Party members of the Missouri House of Representatives
Republican Party Missouri state senators